Kátia Lund (born March 13, 1966) is a Brazilian film director and screenwriter. Her most notable work was as co-director of the film City of God.

Early life
Lund was born in São Paulo, to American parents who emigrated to Brazil before she was born. She graduated from Escola Maria Imaculada, an American Catholic school in São Paulo where she excelled in art. She then attended Brown University, where she became interested in filmmaking.

Career
After she graduated magna cum laude, she landed jobs as an assistant director on many music videos, commercials and films. Having grown up in a middle-class family, she had little knowledge of the plight of those living in Rio de Janeiro's favelas. Then, she was hired to work on the Spike Lee-directed music video for Michael Jackson's "They Don't Care About Us" which was filmed in a favela. The experience opened her eyes and she became determined to make films about the dwellers of these poor neighborhoods to help raise social consciousness in Brazil. She has caused controversy for her friendship with, and admiration for, deceased Brazilian drug dealer Marcinho VP.

Lund oversees an organization called Nós do Cinema (We of Cinema), which began with the young people from the cast of City of God who are real dwellers of Rio's favelas. Lund initially started her non-profit acting school to find the cast for City of God. Nós do Cinema offers courses and job opportunities in films to poor children and holds screenings and discussions that help to raise social consciousness through film. She also directed a segment of the film All the Invisible Children.

Filmography

Awards and nominations
In 1996, she began work on the documentary Notícias de uma Guerra Particular (News of a Private War), an exploration of the ongoing battle between the favelas' heavily armed drug dealers (many of whom are small children) and Rio de Janeiro's police. It was released in 1999 to critical acclaim and was nominated for an Emmy after airing on PBS. The success of the film made her an in-demand director of music videos for Brazil's hip-hop artists. She won numerous MTV Video Music Awards Latin America.

In 2001, Lund was invited by Fernando Meirelles to co-direct Golden Gate (Palace II), a short film about two young boys in a favela. The film won several awards in film festivals all over the world.  Lund and Meirelles continued their collaboration with the film City of God which received international acclaim and was nominated for four Academy Awards including best director (Lund was not nominated, only Meirelles received recognition from the Academy).  The success of that film was the springboard for the television series City of Men, a continuation of the story told in Golden Gate. Lund produced the show with Meirelles and directed four episodes. The show was a major hit in Brazil.

References

External links

1966 births
Living people
People from São Paulo
Brazilian people of American descent
Brazilian film directors
Brazilian screenwriters
Brazilian women film directors
Brazilian women screenwriters
Brown University alumni